Jazell Barbie Royale (born August 8, 1987, in Jacksonville, Florida) is an American transgender performer and beauty pageant competitor. She is notable for winning the Miss Continental pageant in 2016, and in 2019, became the second American, and the first woman of African descent, to win the Miss International Queen.

As of 2019, she was an Orlando resident working as a healthcare provider, and a nightclub performer. She was succeeded as Miss International Queen in 2020 by Valentina Fluchaire of Mexico.

In May 2022, her nomination was announced at the 2022 WOWIE Awards as part of RuPaul's DragCon in Los Angeles in the category Hottest Hottie Award (The Thirst Follow Award). She is slated to compete on the second season of Queen of the Universe in 2023.

References

Sources

1987 births
Living people
African-American beauty pageant winners
LGBT African Americans
LGBT people from Florida
Miss International Queen winners
People from Jacksonville, Florida
People from Orlando, Florida
Transgender entertainers
Transgender women